John Sydenham, of Somerset, was MP for the Bridgwater constituency of the parliament of England six times between 1377 and 1397.  He was recorded as a tax collector in Somerset in 1382, 1392 and 1401.  During the Peasants' Revolt of 1381 his manor house at Sydenham, near Bridgwater was ransacked and goods to the value of £100 stolen.  His daughter Ida married Robert Boson, who was MP for Bridgwater in the 1393 parliament.

References

Year of birth missing
Year of death missing
English MPs October 1377
English MPs 1378
English MPs 1386
English MPs February 1388
English MPs 1391
English MPs September 1397
14th-century English politicians
15th-century English politicians